Ulrik Kirkely (born 5 January 1972) is a Danish handball coach of  Odense Håndbold. He coached the Japanese national team at the 2017 World Women's Handball Championship.

References

1972 births
Living people
Danish handball coaches
Danish expatriate sportspeople in Japan
Handball coaches of international teams